Cam Sedgwick (born February 14, 1978 in Vancouver, British Columbia) is a professional lacrosse player for the Washington Stealth of the National Lacrosse League. He played his last game on Saturday, April 28, 2012

NLL career
Cam Sedgwick was originally drafted by the Toronto Rock (second round 13th overall) in 1998. He played three seasons for Vancouver Ravens (2002–04) prior to joining Stealth. Sedgwick was named Rookie of the Month (January 2003) as a member of the Ravens. He scored 48 points (16 goals, 32 assists) for Vancouver in 2003. Sedgwick was selected first round (third overall) by Arizona in the Vancouver Dispersal Draft in 2004.
He is now retired playing his last game Saturday April 28

WLA career
Sedgwick has played for the Burnaby Lakers in the Western Lacrosse Association (2001–present). He won the Commissioner's Trophy as the League's Most Valuable Player in 2007 and 2008. Sedwick scored 52 points (27 goals, 25 assists) and was third in the league with 26 playoff points in 2008.

References

1978 births
Canadian lacrosse players
Lacrosse people from British Columbia
Living people
San Jose Stealth players
Sportspeople from Vancouver
Washington Stealth players
Vancouver Ravens players